Plasmodium chiricahuae is a parasite of the genus Plasmodium subgenus Paraplasmodium.

Like all Plasmodium species P. chiricahuae has both vertebrate and insect hosts. The vertebrate hosts for this parasite are reptiles.

Description 
The schizonts rarely exceed the size of the nucleus of the cell and produce 4-10 merozoites.

The gametocytes are large (3-6 times the size of the nucleus of an uninfected cell) and almost fill the erythrocyte.

Distribution 
This species is found in the south-western United States and probably also in northern Mexico.

Hosts 
This species infects spiny lizards of the genus Sceloporus.

References

Further reading 

chiricahuae